"The Radio Ham" is an episode from the comedy series Hancock, the final BBC series featuring British comedian Tony Hancock. First transmitted on 9 June 1961, the show was written by Ray Galton and Alan Simpson, and was produced by Duncan Wood. The title is a retronym.

Synopsis 

Anthony Hancock has taken up amateur radio as a hobby but is dissatisfied with his conversations with other users, which consist mainly of remote games of chess and Snakes and Ladders, as well as discussions about the weather with a fellow operator in Tokyo who speaks poor English.

Just as he is expressing his wish for more excitement in his hobby he hears a distress signal from a yachtsman whose boat is sinking. Hancock tries to help but struggles to copy down the man's location details correctly, suffering numerous inconveniences and interruptions such as a broken pencil, having to put another shilling in the electricity meter, having his radio set forcibly disconnected by his burly neighbour, getting the longitude and latitude mixed up and/or completely wrong, and, finally, the radio's valves (which he had just replaced at the start of the episode) giving out.

Hancock enlists the help of the police to get new valves, but when he gets his radio set working again he cannot re-establish contact with the man in distress. One of the police officers then reads in the newspaper that the yachtsman was rescued with the assistance of a radio operator in Tokyo, whom Hancock assumes with dismay to be his interlocutor from earlier.

Resuming his usual radio activities Hancock suffers checkmate in his chess game, following which he disconnects all the cables from his radio set whilst singing "When You Come to the End of a Perfect Day".

Cast 

 Tony Hancock ... Anthony Aloysius Hancock
 Annie Leake ... Woman
 Michael Peake ... Very large man
 Edwin Richfield ... Policeman
 Bernard Hunter ... Policeman
 Andrew Faulds ... Yachtsman's voice
 John Bluthal ... Radio voice
 Geoffrey Matthews ... Radio voice
 Geoffrey Lewis ... Radio voice 
 Honor Shepherd ... Radio voice

Pye re-recording

In October 1961 Pye Records produced an audio remake of "The Radio Ham", together with a remake of "The Blood Donor" from the same series. These were produced in the style of the radio shows, complete with an invited studio audience, and released as an LP in 1961. These recordings have been available more or less continuously ever since, and are also found on several British comedy compilation sets.

The re-recorded Pye version has a different ending from the original, with Hancock instead announcing over the airwaves that he is selling his radio equipment and inviting bids for it.

Paul Merton remake

A remake starring Paul Merton in the Hancock role was broadcast on ITV on 9 February 1996 as part of the series Paul Merton in Galton & Simpson's...

In popular culture

The line "Would you stop playing with that radio of yours, I'm trying to get to sleep!" from the Pye re-recording has seen common use in royalty-free sample libraries, leading to its use in singles such as George Michael's "Too Funky".

References

External links
 

1961 British television episodes
BBC television comedy